The 2022–23 Maltese Premier League is the 108th season of top-flight league football in Malta. The season began on the 20th August 2022 and will end between April and May 2023. Hibernians are the defending champions, having won their 13th title the previous season.

Format 
For this season the Malta Football Association decided to expand the league to 14 teams starting with this season.

Teams 

Fourteen teams will compete in the league – the top ten teams from the previous season and the four teams promoted from the Maltese Challenge League. The promoted teams are Żebbuġ Rangers, Marsaxlokk, and Pietà Hotspurs, who will return after an absence of five, seven, ten and eight years from the top flight respectively. They will replace Sliema Wanderers (relegated after thirty-seven years in the top flight).

Stadiums

Personnel and kits 

 Additionally, referee kits are made by Macron

Managerial changes

League table
<onlyinclude>

Results

Season statistics

Scoring

Top scorers

Hat-tricks

Clean sheets

Discipline

Player
 Most yellow cards: 7
 Neil Anthony Micallef (Gudja United)

 Most red cards: 2
 Luis Riascos (Gżira United)
 Juan Cruz Aguilar (Marsaxlokk)
 Eslit Sala (Valletta)

Club
 Most yellow cards: 69
Marsaxlokk
 Most red cards: 7
Marsaxlokk

Awards

Monthly awards

References

Maltese Premier League seasons
Malta
1
Malta